A historian is an individual who studies and writes on history.

Historian may also refer to:
A list of historians includes hundreds of writers with articles in  Wikipedia
Operational historian, a software application that logs or historizes data
Historian (medical), a medical term for the narrator of a medical history
The Historian, a 2005 novel by Elizabeth Kostova
The Historian (journal), a history journal
Historian (album), a 2018 album by Lucy Dacus
The Historian (film), a 2014 drama film